Twifo/Heman/Lower Denkyira District is a former district that was located in Central Region, Ghana. Originally created as an ordinary district assembly in 1988, which was created from the former Denkyira District Council. However on 28 June 2012, it was split off into two new districts: Twifo-Atti Morkwa District (capital: Twifo Praso) and Hemang-Lower Denkyira District (capital: Twifo Hemang). The district assembly was located in the northwest part of Central Region and had Twifo Praso as its capital town.

Places of interest
Twifo/Heman/Lower Denkyira District is where Kakum National Park is located. The district also has the River Pra and the Twifo Oil Palm Plantation Limited Company.

List of settlements

Sources

External links
 Central Region » Twifo/Heman/Lower Denkyira District

References

Central Region (Ghana)

Districts of the Central Region (Ghana)